Cha Jin-ho(Korean:차진호) is a South Korean wheelchair curler.

Teams

References

External links 

Living people
South Korean male curlers
South Korean wheelchair curlers
South Korean disabled sportspeople
Year of birth missing (living people)
Place of birth missing (living people)
21st-century South Korean people